Veretennikov is a Russian masculine surname, its feminine counterpart is Veretennikova. It may refer to
Irina Veretennicoff (born 1944), Belgian physicist
Oleg Veretennikov (born 1970), Russian football player and coach

Russian-language surnames